Shordyn is a rural locality (a settlement) in Kebratskoye Rural Settlement, Gaynsky District, Perm Krai, Russia. The population was 97 as of 2010. There are 3 streets.

Geography 
Shordyn is located 22 km north of Gayny (the district's administrative centre) by road. Kebraty is the nearest rural locality.

References 

Rural localities in Gaynsky District